Leucoptera sinuella is a moth in the Lyonetiidae family. It is found in most of Europe, except Ireland, the Balkan Peninsula and the Mediterranean Islands. It is also found in Japan (Hokkaido, Honshu) and North Africa.

The larvae feed on Populus alba, Populus candicans, Populus deltoides, Populus gileadensis, Populus nigra, Populus tremula, Salix aurita, Salix caprea, Salix cinerea, Salix fragilis, Salix purpurea. They mine the leaves of their host plant. The mine consists of a large, upper-surface blotch. Pupation takes place outside of the mine.

References

Leucoptera (moth)
Moths described in 1853
Moths of Japan
Moths of Europe
Moths of Africa